Ticonderoga Publications is an Australian independent publishing house founded by Russell B. Farr in 1996. Currently Farr and Liz Grzyb continue to run the publication. The publisher specializes in collections of science fiction short stories.

History and current
Ticonderoga Publications was founded by Russell B. Farr in 1996. Co-partner in Ticonderoga Publications is editor Liz Grzyb. The publisher initially specialized in collections of science fiction short stories. Between 1996 and 1999, it published collections by Steven Utley, Sean Williams, Stephen Dedman, and other writers.  According to Peek, "Under Farr, Ticonderoga Publications gathered a reputation for producing sturdy, thick-papered, elegant collections."

Ticonderoga Publications suspended producing books in 1999 when the Australian government brought in the GST (Goods and Services Tax) that raised the price of books by ten percent, with the editor concentrating on his TiconderogaOnline webzine instead.

In 2005, Ticonderoga Publications announced resumed publication with two new anthologies released in late 2006-early 2007. In 2006, it published Troy, a collection by Simon Brown. In 2007, it published the Ditmar Award-winning Fantastic Wonder Stories, edited by Russell B. Farr.

Ticonderoga Publications has published several anthologies, including The Workers' Paradise (2007) edited by Russell B. Farr and Nick Evans, Australia's first SF anthology to explore the future of work; Scary Kisses (2010) edited by Liz Grzyb, Australia's first paranormal romance anthology; and Belong (2010) edited by Russell B. Farr, twenty-three stories of interstellar immigration with writers from Australia, Bulgaria, Canada, USA, UK, and New Zealand.

In 2008, Ticonderoga Publications published Magic Dirt: the best of Sean Williams, winner of the inaugural Aurealis Award for Best Collection.

From 2010 to 2015, Ticonderoga Press published The Year's Best Australian Fantasy and Horror series, edited by Liz Grzyb and Talie Helene.

The West Australian newspaper has described Ticonderoga Publications as one of "the most important micro presses in Australia".

Authors

Published
 Howard Waldrop
 Steven Utley
 Simon Brown
 Sean Williams
 Stephen Dedman
 Lewis Shiner
 Terry Dowling
 Kim Wilkins
 Kaaron Warren
 Angela Slatter
 Justina Robson
 Lucy Sussex
 Lisa L. Hannett
 Sara Douglass
 Felicity Dowker
 Greg Mellor
 Juliet Marillier
 Cat Sparks
 Glenda Larke
 Jason Fischer
 Patty Jansen
 Janeen Webb
 Ian McHugh
 R. J. Ashby
 Christine Daigle
 Stewart Sternberg
 Anna Tambour
 Alan Baxter

Books

1996
 Custer's Last Jump by Steven Utley and Howard Waldrop ( (chapbook with cover by Shaun Tan, out of print))

1997

1998
 Cannibals of the Fine Light by Simon Brown ( (trade paperback with cover by Emma Barber, out of print))
 A View Before Dying by Sean Williams ( (chapbook with cover by Emma Barber, out of print))

1999
 New Adventures in Sci-fi by Sean Williams ( (trade paperback, out of print))

2006
 Troy by Simon Brown ( (trade paperback))

2007
 The Workers' Paradise edited by Russell B. Farr & Nick Evans ( (trade paperback with cover by Amanda Rainey))
 Fantastic Wonder Stories edited by Russell B. Farr ( (trade paperback))

2008
 Magic Dirt by Sean Williams ( (trade paperback))

2009

2010
 The Infernal by Kim Wilkins ( (limited hardcover))
 Scary Kisses edited by Liz Grzyb ( (trade paperback with cover by Amanda Rainey))

2011

2012
 Damnation and Dames edited by Liz Grzyb and Amanda Pillar ( (trade paperback)
 Mage Heart Book 1 of The Chronicles of Dion by Jane Routley ( (hardcover))
 Aramaya Book 2 of The Chronicles of Dion by Jane Routley ( (hardcover) and )

2013
 Dreaming of Djinn edited by Liz Grzyb ( (trade paperback))

2014
 Kisses by Clockwork, edited by Liz Grzyb
 Black-Winged Angels by Angela Slatter (978-1-921857-54-6 (limited hardcover))

2015

2016

2017
 The Year's Best Australian Fantasy and Horror 2015, edited by Liz Grzyb and Talie Helene (hardcover and trade paperback)
 Ecopunk! - speculative tales of radical futures, edited by Liz Grzyb and Cat Sparks (trade paperback and e-book)
 The Silver Well, by Kate Forsyth and Kim Wilkins (limited hardcover, hardcover, and paperback)

2018
 Aurum, edited by Russell B. Farr.

2020
 Songs for Dark Seasons by Lisa L. Hannett.

Awards

Wins

1999
 New Adventures in Sci-Fi, Sean Williams. Winner Ditmar Award Collected Work
 "Atrax", Sean Williams and Simon Brown, in Magic Dirt. Winner Aurealis Award Horror Short Story
 Antique Futures: The Best of Terry Dowling. Winner Aurealis Award Convenor's Award (TP was part of MP Books)

2005
 TiconderogaOnline. Winner Ditmar Award Fanzine

2007
 Fantastic Wonder Stories, edited by Russell B. Farr. Winner Ditmar Award Collected Work
 "A Scar for Leida", Deborah Biancotti, in Fantastic Wonder Stories. Winner Aurealis Award YA Short Story

2008
 Magic Dirt: the Best of Sean Williams. Winner Aurealis Award Collection

2010
 The Girl With No Hands: and other tales, Angela Slatter. Winner Aurealis Award Collection

2011
 Bluegrass Symphony, Lisa L. Hannett. Winner Aurealis Award Collection
 Dead Red Heart, Russell B. Farr (ed). Winner Australian Shadows Award Edited Publication

2012
 Russell B. Farr. Winner Chandler Award
 Cover art for Midnight and Moonshine, Kathleen Jennings. Winner Ditmar Award Artwork

2013

 "Scarp", Cat Sparks, in The Bride Price. Winner Ditmar Award Short Story
 The Bride Price, Cat Sparks, edited by Russell B. Farr. Winner Ditmar Award Collected Work
 "The Year of Ancient Ghosts", Kim Wilkins, in The Year of Ancient Ghosts. Winner Aurealis Award Horror Short Story
 The Year's Best Australian Fantasy & Horror 2012, Liz Grzyb and Talie Helene (eds). Winner Aurealis Award Anthology.
 "By Bone-Light", Juliet Marillier, in Prickle Moon. Winner Aurealis Award Young Adult Short Story.

2015

 Bloodlines, Amanda Pillar (ed.) Winner Aurealis Award Anthology
 "A Hedge of Yellow Roses", Kathleen Jennings, in Hear Me Roar. Winner Ditmar Award Short Story

Nominations

1998
 Cannibals of the Fine Light cover, Emma Barber. Nominee Ditmar Award Professional Artwork
 A View Before Dying cover, Emma Barber. Nominee Ditmar Award Professional Artwork

1999
 The Lady of Situations, Stephen Dedman. Nominee Ditmar Award Collected Work

2000
 "A Sentiment Open to Doubt", Stephen Dedman, in Ticonderoga Online. Nominee Aurealis Award Horror Short Story

2003
 No Award. Nominee Ditmar Award Fanzine

2005
 "Summa Seltzer Missive", Deborah Biancotti, in Ticonderoga Online. Nominee Ditmar Award Short Story
 "Macciato Lane", Cat Sparks, in Ticonderoga Online. Nominee Aurealis Award Horror Short Story

2006
 Russell B Farr. Nominee Ditmar Award Professional Achievement

2007
 The Workers' Paradise, edited by Russell B. Farr and Nick Evans. Nominee Ditmar Award Collected Work
 "Yamabushi Kaidan and the Smoke Dragon", Shane Jiraiya Cummings, in Fantastic Wonder Stories. Nominee Ditmar Award Novella
 "His Lipstick Minx", Kaaron Warren, in The Workers' Paradise. Nominee Ditmar Award Short Story
 "A Scar for Leida", Deborah Biancotti, in Fantastic Wonder Stories. Nominee Ditmar Award Short Story
 The Workers' Paradise cover, Amanda Rainey. Nominee Ditmar Award Artwork
 Russell B Farr. Nominee Ditmar Award Professional Achievement
 "Arctica", Cat Sparks, in Fantastic Wonder Stories. Finalist Aurealis Award SF Short Story
 "Lonely as Life", Simon Brown, in Fantastic Wonder Stories. Finalist Aurealis Award SF Short Story
 "Cast Off", Tracey Rolfe, in Fantastic Wonder Stories. Finalist Aurealis Award YA Short Story
 "Yamabushi Kaidan and the Smoke Dragon", Shane Jiraiya Cummings, in Fantastic Wonder Stories. Finalist Aurealis Award YA Short Story
 "There Was Darkness", Martin Livings, in Fantastic Wonder Stories. Finalist Australian Shadows Award

2010
 "Bread and Circuses", Felicity Dowker, in Scary Kisses. Nominee Ditmar Award Short Story
 "The February Dragon", Angela Slatter and L.L. Hannett, in Scary Kisses. Nominee Ditmar Award Short Story.
 Cover design for The Girl With No Hands and Other Tales, Lisa L. Hannett. Nominee Ditmar Award Achievement
 Cover design for Scary Kisses, Amanda Rainey. Nominee Ditmar Award Achievement
 Dead Sea Fruit, Kaaron Warren. Nominee Aurealis Award Collection
 "The February Dragon", Angela Slatter and L.L. Hannett, in Scary Kisses. Nominee Aurealis Award Fantasy Short Story
 "Border Crossing", Penelope Love, in Belong. Nominee Aurealis Award Science Fiction Short Story
 Scary Kisses, edited by Liz Grzyb. Finalist Australian Shadows Award Edited Publication
 The Girl With No Hands and other tales by Angela Slatter, in Scary Kisses. Finalist Australian Shadows Award Long Fiction
 "Bread and Circuses" by Felicity Dowker. Finalist Australian Shadows Award Short Fiction

2011
 "The Dark Night of Anton Weiss", D.C. White, in More Scary Kisses. Nominee Aurealis Award Fantasy Short Story
 "The Short Go: A Future in Eight Seconds", Lisa L. Hannett, in Bluegrass Symphony. Nominee Aurealis Award Horror Short Story
 Year's Best Australian Fantasy and Horror 2010, edited by Liz Grzyb and Talie Helene. Nominee Aurealis Award Anthology
 "From the Teeth of Strange Children", Lisa L. Hannett, in Bluegrass Symphony. Finalist Australian Shadows Award Long Fiction
 "The Sea at Night", Joanne Anderton, in Dead Red Heart. Finalist Australian Shadows Award Short Fiction
 "Taking It for the Team", Tracie McBride, in Dead Red Heart. Finalist Australian Shadows Award Short Fiction
 More Scary Kisses, Liz Grzyb (ed). Finalist Australian Shadows Award Edited Publication
 The Year's Best Fantasy and Horror, Liz Grzyb and Talie Helene (ed). Finalist Australian Shadows Award Edited Publication
 Bluegrass Symphony, Lisa L. Hannett. Finalist Australian Shadows Award Collection
 Matilda Told Such Dreadful Lies, Lucy Sussex. Finalist Australian Shadows Award Collection

2012
 "Sanaa's Army" by Joanne Anderton, in Bloodstones. Nominee Ditmar Award Short Story
 Midnight and Moonshine, Lisa L Hannett and Angela Slatter. Nominee Ditmar Award Collected Work
 The Year's Best Australian Fantasy and Horror 2011, edited by Liz Grzyb and Talie Helene. Nominee Ditmar Award Collected Work
 "Beyond Winter’s Shadow", Greg Mellor, in Wild Chrome. Finalist Aurealis Award Science Fiction Short Story
 "The Trouble With Memes", Greg Mellor, in Wild Chrome. Finalist Aurealis Award Science Fiction Short Story
 "Sanaa's Army" by Joanne Anderton, in Bloodstones. Finalist Aurealis Award Fantasy Short Story
 "Sanaa's Army" by Joanne Anderton, in Bloodstones. Finalist Aurealis Award Horror Short Story
 "To Wish On A Clockwork Heart", Felicity Dowker, in Bread and Circuses. Finalist Aurealis Award Horror Short Story
 The Year's Best Australian Fantasy & Horror 2011, Liz Grzyb and Talie Helene (eds). Finalist Aurealis Award Anthology
 Bloodstones, Amanda Pillar (ed). Finalist Aurealis Award Anthology
 Midnight and Moonshine, Lisa L Hannett and Angela Slatter. Finalist Aurealis Award Collection
 "To Wish On A Clockwork Heart", Felicity Dowker, in Bread and Circuses. Finalist Australian Shadows Award Short Fiction
 The Year's Best Australian Fantasy & Horror 2011, Liz Grzyb and Talie Helene (eds). Finalist Australian Shadows Award Edited Publication
 Bread and Circuses, Felicity Dowker. Finalist Australian Shadows Award Collection

2013

 "Prickle Moon", Juliet Marillier, in Prickle Moon. Nominee Ditmar Award Novella or Novelette
 "The Year of Ancient Ghosts", Kim Wilkins, in The Year of Ancient Ghosts. Nominee Ditmar Award Novella or Novelette
 "By Bone-Light", Juliet Marillier, in Prickle Moon. Nominee Ditmar Award Novella or Novelette
 Cover art, Cat Sparks, for The Bride Price by Cat Sparks. Nominee Ditmar Award Artwork
 Cover art, Pia Ravenari, for Prickle Moon by Juliet Marillier. Nominee Ditmar Award Artwork
 "The Year of Ancient Ghosts", Kim Wilkins, in The Year of Ancient Ghosts. Finalist Aurealis Award Fantasy Short Story
 Dreaming of Djinn, Liz Grzyb (ed). Finalist Aurealis Award Anthology.
 The Bride Price, Cat Sparks. Finalist Aurealis Award Collection.
 The Year of Ancient Ghosts, Kim Wilkins. Finalist Aurealis Award Collection.

2014
 "Escapement", Stephanie Gunn, in Kisses by Clockwork. Nominee Ditmar Award Novella or Novelette
 The Year's Best Australian Fantasy and Horror 2013, edited by Liz Grzyb and Talie Helene. Nominee Ditmar Award Collected Work
 Illustrations, Kathleen Jennings, in Black-Winged Angels, Nominee Ditmar Award Artwork
 Kisses by Clockwork, Liz Grzyb (ed). Finalist Aurealis Award Anthology
 Angel Dust, Ian McHugh. Finalist Aurealis Award Collection
 Black-Winged Angels, Angela Slatter. Finalist Aurealis Award Collection

2015

 "Blueblood”, Faith Mudge, in Hear Me Roar. Finalist Aurealis Award Young Adult Short Story
 "Blueblood”, Faith Mudge, in Hear Me Roar. Finalist Aurealis Award Fantasy Short Story
 "Broken Glass", Stephanie Gunn, in Hear Me Roar, Finalist Aurealis Award Fantasy Novella
 "The Flowers that Bloom Where Blood Touches the Earth", Stephanie Gunn, in Bloodlines. Finalist Aurealis Award Fantasy Novella
 The Finest Ass in the Universe, Anna Tambour. Finalist Aurealis Award Collection
 The Year’s Best Australian Fantasy and Horror 2014, Liz Grzyb and Talie Helene (eds.). Finalist Aurealis Award Anthology
 Bloodlines, Amanda Pillar (ed.). Nominee Ditmar Award Collected Work
 Cover art for Bloodlines, Kathleen Jennings. Nominee Ditmar Award Artwork

References

External links
 
 TiconderogaOnline (as archived, 3 April, 2012)
 Internet Science Fiction Database

Australian speculative fiction publishers
British speculative fiction publishers
Companies based in Perth, Western Australia
Publishing companies established in 1996
Science fiction publishers
Small press publishing companies
Horror book publishing companies